Michael Yama (November 14, 1943July 30, 2020), was an American actor who has regularly voiced for GI Joe. He has been on The X-Files, Just Shoot Me and Lois & Clark and he starred on Betty White's Off Their Rockers. Prior to his death on July 30, 2020, he had worked in theater for over 38 years.

Partial filmography

 The Bad News Bears Go to Japan (1978) as Usher
 Hansel and Gretel (1983) as Step Mother / Wicked Witch
 My Tutor (1983) as Mr. Russell
 Deal of the Century (1983) as Masaggi's Aide #2
 Indiana Jones and the Temple of Doom (1984) as Chinese Co-Pilot
 Bachelor Party (1984) as Japanese Businessman
 Down and Out in Beverly Hills (1986) as Nagamichi
 Winners Take All (1987) as Japanese Representative 
 Number One with a Bullet (1987) as Charlie 'Tai Chi Charlie'
 The Hidden (1987) as Sketch Artist
 Stand and Deliver (1988) as Sanzaki
 Catchfire (1990) as Technician
 It's Pat (1994) as Curious Sushi Man
 Molly (1999) as Asian Client
 Chain of Command (2000) as Chairman Tzu
 Now Chinatown (2000) as Deputy Consul
 Elvis Took a Bullet (2001) as Larry, The Waiter
 All Babes Want to Kill Me (2005) as Mr. Cho
 True Crime: New York City (2005) as Additional voices
 Dead Rising (2006) as Larry Chiang (voice)
 Speechless (2006) as Mr. Sakamoto
 Click (2006) as Watsuhita, Head Executive
 Big Dreams Little Tokyo (2006) as Mr. Ozu
 Doctor Strange: The Sorcerer Supreme (2007) as Ancient One (voice)
 Drillbit Taylor (2008) as Asian Heritage Speaker
 The Sensei (2008) as Yori Nakano
 The Chosen One (2010) as Mr. Nakamuri
 Pure Country 2: The Gift (2010) as Morita
 Adultolescence (2011) as Mr. May / Baba
 Betty White's Off Their Rockers (2013-2014) as Various characters
 Dumb and Dumber To (2014) as Harry's Dad
 I'll See You in My Dreams (2015) as Speed Dater 4
 Hail, Caesar! (2016) – Chinese Restaurant Maitre D'
 Avatar: The Last Airbender: Agni Kai (2020) as Fire Priest

References

Place of birth missing
2020 deaths
American male film actors
American male television actors
American male voice actors
American male actors of Japanese descent
American film actors of Asian descent
1943 births